Gilla Cellaig Ó Ruaidín, aka Gilbert Ó Ruane, Bishop of Kilmacduagh, died 1204.

Ó Ruaidín (Rooane, Ruane, Rowan) was the third member of his family to serve as Bishop of Kilmacduagh, and the last. His family was one of two apparently unrelated families, based in what would become County Mayo and County Galway, respectively. The Galway family was of the Ui Maine.

He was elected before 5 May 1248 and received possession of the temporalities after that date. He died before 10 November 1253. He was also known as Gillebertus or Gilbert, a Latinisation of his forename.

See also

 Tom Ruane

References

 The Surnames of Ireland, Edward MacLysaght, 1978.

External links
 http://www.ucc.ie/celt/published/T100005C/
 http://www.irishtimes.com/ancestor/surname/index.cfm?fuseaction=Go.&UserID=

People from County Galway
13th-century Roman Catholic bishops in Ireland
Bishops of Kilmacduagh